Egeberg Glacier is a small glacier between Scott Keltie Glacier and Dugdale Glacier, flowing into the west side of Robertson Bay, Victoria Land, Antarctica. The glacier lies situated on the Pennell Coast, a portion of Antarctica lying between Cape Williams and Cape Adare.

This geographical feature was first charted by the British Antarctic Expedition 1898–1900, under C.E. Borchgrevink, who named it for Consul Westye Egeberg of Christiania (now Oslo), Norway.

In the area surrounding Egeberg Glacier there are unusually many named ice formations.

References 

Glaciers of Pennell Coast